Let It Bleed is the eighth British and tenth American studio album by the English rock band the Rolling Stones, released 28 November 1969 on London Records in the United States and shortly thereafter by Decca Records in the United Kingdom. Released shortly after the band's 1969 American Tour, it is the follow-up to 1968's Beggars Banquet. As with Beggars Banquet, the album marks a return to the group's more blues-sound approach that was prominent in the pre-Aftermath period of their career. Additional sounds on the album draw influence from gospel, country blues and country rock.

The album was recorded during a period of turmoil in the band; Brian Jones, the band's founder and original leader, had become increasingly unreliable in the studio due to heavy drug use, and during most recording sessions was either absent, or so incapacitated that he was unable to contribute meaningfully. He was fired in the midst of recording sessions for this album, and replaced by Mick Taylor. Jones appeared on this album on only two songs, playing backing instruments. Jones died within a month of being fired.

Taylor had been hired after principal recording was complete on many of the tracks, and appears on two songs, having recorded some guitar overdubs. Keith Richards was the band's sole guitarist during most of the recording sessions, being responsible for nearly all of the rhythm and lead parts. The other Stones members (Mick Jagger, Bill Wyman and Charlie Watts) appear on nearly every track, with contributions by percussionist Jimmy Miller (who also produced the album), keyboardists Nicky Hopkins and Ian Stewart, and guest musicians including Ry Cooder.

The album charted top ten in several markets, including reaching number one in the UK and number three in the US. While no high-charting singles were released from the album, many of the album's songs became staples of Rolling Stones live shows and on rock radio stations for decades to come, including "Gimme Shelter" and "You Can't Always Get What You Want", both of them listed on "best ever" songs lists. The album was voted number 40 in Colin Larkin's All Time Top 1000 Albums 3rd edition (2000). In 2005, the album was inducted into the Grammy Hall of Fame, and is on Rolling Stones 500 Greatest Albums of All Time list.

Recording
Although the Rolling Stones had begun the recording of "You Can't Always Get What You Want" in November 1968, before Beggars Banquet had been released, recording for Let It Bleed began in earnest in February 1969 and continued sporadically until early November. Brian Jones, the band's original leader and founder, had, over the course of the recording of the previous two albums, become increasingly detached from the group. Though present in the studio, he was frequently too intoxicated to contribute meaningfully, and after a motorcycle accident in May 1969, missed several recording sessions whilst recovering. Always a talented multi-instrumentalist, Jones had previously contributed extensively on guitar, forming an integral part of the dual-guitar sound that was central to the band's chemistry. He was fired from the band during the recording of Let It Bleed, having performed on only two tracks: playing autoharp on "You Got the Silver", and percussion on "Midnight Rambler". A month after being fired, Jones was found at the bottom of his swimming pool at his home. The coroner's report stated this was a drowning, later revised to "death by misadventure", however, theories soon emerged that he may have been killed by Frank Thorogood, a builder doing construction work on the property who had been having a fight with Jones. These theories have never been proved.

As with the previous album, most of the guitar parts were recorded instead by the band's other guitarist, Keith Richards, during the period of principal recording. Jones's replacement, Mick Taylor, appears on just two tracks, "Country Honk" and "Live with Me", having contributed some overdubs during the May 1969 London Olympic Studios recording sessions. He also appears on "Honky Tonk Women", a stand-alone single recorded during the Let It Bleed sessions.

Richards sang his first solo lead vocal on a Rolling Stones recording with "You Got the Silver", having previously sung harmony and background vocals with primary vocalist Mick Jagger on "Connection" and shared alternating lead vocals with Jagger on parts of "Something Happened to Me Yesterday" and "Salt of the Earth". Additional vocals were provided by the London Bach Choir, who sang on "You Can't Always Get What You Want". The choir distanced themselves from their contribution, however, citing what author Stephen Davis terms its "relentless drug ambience". Bassist Bill Wyman appears on every track except for two, on which Richards played bass. Drummer Charlie Watts performed on all of the tracks except for "You Can't Always Get What You Want"; he struggled to attain the sought-after rhythm, so producer Jimmy Miller filled in for him instead.

Let It Bleed was originally scheduled for release in July 1969. Although "Honky Tonk Women" was released as a single that month, the album itself was delayed and eventually released in December 1969, after the band's US tour had completed. The majority of the album was recorded at Olympic Studios in London, with further work taking place at Elektra Sound Recorders Studios in Los Angeles, California, while the Stones prepared for the tour. The Los Angeles-recorded portions included overdubs by guest musicians Merry Clayton (on "Gimme Shelter"), Byron Berline (on "Country Honk"), and Bobby Keys and Leon Russell (on "Live with Me").

Musical style 
As with Beggars Banquet the previous year, the album marks a return to the group's more blues-based approach that was prominent in the pre-Aftermath period of their career. The main inspiration during this string of albums was American roots music and Let It Bleed is no exception, drawing heavily from gospel (evident in "Gimme Shelter" and "You Can't Always Get What You Want"), Hank Williams and Jimmie Rodgers ("Country Honk"), Chicago blues ("Midnight Rambler"), as well as country blues ("You Got the Silver", "Love in Vain") and country rock ("Let It Bleed").

Don Heckman, writing in The New York Times, felt that Let It Bleed was a "heavy" and "passionately erotic" album of hard rock and blues, influenced by African-American music. Richie Unterberger, writing for AllMusic, said it "extends the rock and blues feel of Beggars Banquet into slightly harder-rocking, more demonically sexual territory". Mojo magazine's James McNair felt the record had an emphasis on "earthy" country blues.

Through their experimentation during the mid-1960s, the band had developed an eclectic approach to arrangements. Slide guitar playing is prominent (played entirely by Richards, except "Country Honk", which was performed by Taylor), and is featured on all songs except "Gimme Shelter", "Live with Me" and "You Can't Always Get What You Want", giving the album an authentic blues feel throughout. In addition, an array of session musicians embellish the songs with various instruments. Alongside the piano performances (Ian Stewart, Nicky Hopkins), the record included fiddle (Byron Berline), mandolin (Ry Cooder), organ and French horn (Al Kooper), as well as vibes (Wyman) and autoharp (Wyman and Jones). Of more importance, however, was the debut of both renowned saxophonist Bobby Keys on "Live with Me", a musician who was integral at giving the group's arrangements a soul/jazz background, and Taylor, who took on lead guitar duties with technically proficient playing, giving the band a harder rock sound during the late 1960s and early 1970s.

Lyrics 

Jann Wenner, in a 1995 Rolling Stone interview with Jagger, describes the album's songs as "disturbing" and the scenery as "ugly". When asked if the Vietnam War played a role in the album's worldview, Jagger said: "I think so. Even though I was living in America only part time, I was influenced. All those images were on television. Plus, the spill out onto campuses".

Packaging
The album cover displays a surreal sculpture designed by Robert Brownjohn. The image consists of the Let It Bleed record being played by the tone-arm of an antique phonograph, and a record-changer spindle supporting several items stacked on a plate in place of a stack of records: a film canister labelled Stones – Let It Bleed, a clock dial, a pizza, a bicycle tyre and a cake with elaborate icing topped by figurines representing the band. The cake parts of the construction were prepared by then-unknown cookery writer Delia Smith. The reverse of the LP sleeve shows the same "record-stack" melange in a state of disarray. The artwork was inspired by the working title of the album, which was Automatic Changer.

Jagger originally asked artist M. C. Escher to design a cover for the album; Escher declined. The album cover was among the ten chosen by the Royal Mail for a set of "Classic Album Cover" postage stamps issued in January 2010.

Release and reception

Released in November, Let It Bleed reached number 1 in the UK (temporarily demoting the Beatles' Abbey Road) and number 3 on the Billboard Top LPs chart in the US, where it eventually went 2× platinum. In a contemporary review for Rolling Stone magazine, music critic Greil Marcus said that the middle of the album has "great" songs, but "Gimme Shelter" and "You Can't Always Get What You Want" "seem to matter most" because they "both reach for reality and end up confronting it, almost mastering what's real, or what reality will feel like as the years fade in." Robert Christgau named it the fourth best album of 1969 in his ballot for Jazz & Pop magazine's annual critics poll. In later commentaries, he has said the album "still speak[s] to me with startling fullness and authority", with the quality of the "playing" alone "fantastic", and that despite some "duff moments" on side two, every song "stands up".

Let It Bleed was the Stones' last album to be released in an official mono version, which is rare and highly sought-after today. This mono version is merely a 'fold-down' of the stereo version.  Nevertheless, it was included in the box-set The Rolling Stones in Mono (2016). The album was released in US as an LP record, reel to reel tape, audio cassette and 8-track cartridge in 1969, and as a remastered CD and chrome cassette tape in 1986. In August 2002, it was reissued in a remastered CD and SACD digipak by ABKCO Records, and once more in 2010 by Universal Music Enterprises in a Japanese only SHM-SACD version.

In a retrospective review, NME magazine said that the album "tugs and teases" in various musical directions and called it "a classic". In his 2001 Stones biography, Stephen Davis said of the album "No rock record, before or since, has ever so completely captured the sense of palpable dread that hung over its era." In a five-star review for Rolling Stone in 2004, Gavin Edwards praised Richards' guitar playing throughout the album, and stated: "Whether it was spiritual, menstrual or visceral, the Stones made sure you went home covered in blood." Jason McNeil of PopMatters wrote that Beggars Banquet and Let It Bleed are "the two greatest albums the band’s (or anyone’s) ever made". In Steven Van Zandt's opinion, Let It Bleed was one in the Stones' series of four studio LPs – including Beggars Banquet (1968), Sticky Fingers (1971) and Exile on Main St. (1972) – that was "the greatest run of albums in history".

According to Acclaimed Music, it is the 42nd most celebrated album in popular music history.

The album was included in a "Basic Record Library" of 1950s and 1960s recordings, published in Christgau's Record Guide: Rock Albums of the Seventies (1981). In 2000, Q magazine ranked it at number 28 in its list of "The 100 Greatest British Albums Ever". In 2001, the TV network VH1 placed Let It Bleed at 24th on their "100 Greatest Albums of R 'n' R" survey. In 1997, it was voted the 27th-"Best Album Ever" by The Guardian. In 2003, Rolling Stone ranked it at number 32 on the magazine's list of the "500 Greatest Albums of All Time." It maintained the rating in a 2012 revised list, and was ranked at number 41 in a 2020 revised list. It was inducted into the Grammy Hall of Fame in 2005.

Track listing
The track listing on the back of the album jacket did not follow the one on the album itself. According to Brownjohn, he altered it purely for visual reasons; the correct order was shown on the record's label. Additionally, "Gimme Shelter" is rendered as "Gimmie Shelter" on the jacket. Some releases have "Gimmie Shelter" on the cover, the inner sleeve and the LP label.

Personnel

Track numbers noted in parenthesis below are based on the CD track numbering.

The Rolling Stones
Mick Jagger – lead vocals , backing vocals , harmonica , acoustic guitar 
Keith Richards – electric guitar , acoustic guitar , slide guitar , backing vocals , bass guitar , lead vocals 
Brian Jones – congas , autoharp 
Bill Wyman – bass guitar , autoharp , vibraphone 
Charlie Watts – drums 
Mick Taylor – slide guitar , electric guitar 

Additional personnel
Ian Stewart – piano 
Nicky Hopkins – piano , organ 
Byron Berline – fiddle 
Merry Clayton – vocals 
Ry Cooder – mandolin 
Bobby Keys – tenor saxophone 
Jimmy Miller – percussion , drums , tambourine 
Leon Russell – piano and horn arrangement 
Jack Nitzsche – choral arrangements 
Al Kooper – piano, French horn and organ 
Merry Clayton – backing vocals 
Nanette Workman – backing vocals  (credited as Nanette Newman on the LP)
Doris Troy – backing vocals 
Madeline Bell – backing vocals 
Rocky Dijon – percussion 
The London Bach Choir – vocals

Charts

Certifications

References

External links 
 

The Rolling Stones albums
1969 albums
Decca Records albums
London Records albums
Albums produced by Jimmy Miller
Albums recorded at Olympic Sound Studios
Albums recorded at Sunset Sound Recorders
ABKCO Records albums
Country rock albums by English artists